The Belgian Touring Car Series (BTCS) was an endurance touring car racing series based in Belgium. It is organised by Speedworld and sanctioned by the Royal Automobile Club Belgium. The last BTCS season was in 2011.

Race format
Most meetings consist of two 90-minute heats, with an additional 12-hour race at Circuit de Spa-Francorchamps. The 2010 calendar features three races at Spa, three races at Zolder, and one at the French circuit of Dijon-Prenois.

Cars and classes
The series is open to silhouette racing cars as well as regular touring cars. The Silhoutte classes, S1 and S2, include cars such as the Renault Mégane Trophy, GC Automobile GC-10 V8, Peugeot 406 Silhouette, Peugeot 407 Silhouette, and Volvo S60 BTCS. There are four classes for regular touring cars; T1, T2, T3 and T4. Prizes are available for the winners of each class.

Champions

References

External links
 Official website of the Belgian Touring Car Series (BTCS) 

Auto racing series in Belgium
Touring car racing series